The Joy Boys are an Australian instrumental group. They performed on their own and as a backing band for Col Joye. They had chart success with releases such as top ten singles "Smokey Mokes" (1961) and "Southern 'Rora" (1962).

Members
Kevin Jacobson - piano
Keith Jacobson - bass
Norm Day - guitar
John Bogie - drums
Laurie Irwin - sax/clarient
Ron Patten - sax
Bruce Gurr - keyboards
Dave Bridge - guitar
Rex Blair - drums

Discography
Col Joye’s Joy Boys (1961) - Festival
New Old Time (1962) - Festival
The Joy Boys Fabulous Hits (1962) - Festival
Cookin' up a Party (1963) - Festival
The Surfin' Stompin Joys (1964) - Festival

References

Musical groups established in 1957
Musical groups disestablished in 1966
Australian rock music groups